Hospital Militar de San Carlos is a hospital located in San Fernando in the Province of Cádiz, Andalusia, Spain. Construction of the original hospital building took place by the Franciscans in February 1809, during the war of independence, but the current building was completed in 1981. Located next to the Panteón de Marinos Ilustres, it was the tallest building in San Fernando until the  Torres de la Casería de Ossio surpassed it by several metres.

References

  
 

Hospital buildings completed in 1809
Hospital buildings completed in 1981
Buildings and structures in San Fernando, Cádiz
Hospitals in Andalusia
1809 establishments in Spain